Silver Sword or Silversword may refer to:


Botany
 Silver Sword (botany) or Argyroxiphium, a genus of plants in the sunflower family, Asteraceae
 Silversword alliance, an adaptive radiation of around 30 species in the sunflower family, Asteraceae

Entertainment
 The Silver Sword, a novel by Ian Serraillier
 Silversword, a 2011 fantasy role-playing game
 Silversword (comics), a supervillain in the DC Comics universe
 The original title of the 1992 video game Wizards & Warriors III: Kuros: Visions of Power
 Silversword, a novel by American author Phyllis A. Whitney

Other uses
 Silverswords, the athletic teams that represent Chaminade University of Honolulu, Hawaii